Jaitpur State was a princely state in the Bundelkhand region. It was centered on Jaitpur, in present-day Mahoba district, Uttar Pradesh, which was the capital of the state. There were two forts in the area. 

The last Raja died without issue and Jaitpur State was subsequently annexed by the British Raj.

History
Jaitpur state was founded in 1731 by Jagat Rai, son of the famous Bundela Rajput leader Chhatrasal, as a division of Panna State. In 1765, Ajaigarh State was separated from Jaitpur.
Following the British occupation of Central India Jaitpur became a British protectorate in 1807. 

When Khet Singh, the state's last ruler, died without issue in 1849, the principality was annexed by the British.

Rulers
The rulers of Jaitpur State bore the title 'Raja'.

Rajas
1731 - 1758                Jagat Raj 
1758 - 1765                keerat singh
1765 - ....                Gajraj
.... - 1812               kesri raj
1812 - 1842                Parichat Singh 
1842 - 1849                Khet Singh                         (d. 1849)

See also
Doctrine of Lapse
Panna State

References

External links
Jaitpur Belatal

History of Uttar Pradesh
Mahoba district
Bundelkhand
Princely states of India
Rajputs
British administration in Uttar Pradesh
1731 establishments in India
1849 disestablishments in India